USS Jack H. Lucas (DDG-125) will be an , first of the Flight III variants and 75th overall in the class. She is named after Captain Jacklyn H. Lucas, recipient of the Medal of Honor. On 17 September 2016, she was named by Secretary of the Navy Ray Mabus.

Construction
Jack H. Lucas was launched 4 June 2021, and christened 26 March 2022. The ship is "expected to enter the fleet in 2023," although the U.S. Navy has not given an exact date.

Operational history
Jack H. Lucas left Ingalls, Mississippi on 12 December 2022 for three days of sea trials before returning to port on 15 December 2022.

Namesake

Jacklyn Harold "Jack" Lucas (1928-2008) was a U.S. Marine, and later U.S. Army Airborne Officer, who received the Medal of Honor for his actions at the Battle of Iwo Jima, at the age of 17. He is the youngest Marine and youngest serviceman in World War II to be awarded the United States' highest military decoration for valor.

Gallery

References

External links

Arleigh Burke-class destroyers
2021 ships